Outside of Japan, a  (also gusoku shita), a type of shirt worn by the Samurai class of feudal Japan when they were wearing full armour.

The shitagi was the second garment to be put on, coming second only to the Fundoshi (Japan loincloth). The shitagi was like a short kimono with a button at the neck and a thin attached waist cord (obi).

There are several different types of shitagi. The shitagi would be put on as though it were a kimono, the left hand being put first into its sleeve, and then the right, the neck would then buttoned and the waist cord finally tied at the back.

In the common and modern use of Japanese language, however, "shitagi" just means an underwear.

See also 

 Keikogi
 Uwagi

References

External links 

 Anthony Bryant's samurai armor web site

Samurai clothing
Japanese upper-body garments